The 2019 Dorset Council election was held on Thursday 2 May 2019 to elect councillors to the new Dorset Council in England. It took place on the same day as other district council elections in the United Kingdom.

These were the first elections to the new unitary council, which has come into effect on 1 April 2019. The new unitary authority was created to administer most of the area formerly administered by Dorset County Council, which was previously subdivided into the districts of Weymouth and Portland, West Dorset, North Dorset, Purbeck, and East Dorset. The previous elections in for Dorset County Council took place in 2017, and for the former district councils in 2015 and 2016. Future elections will take place 2024 and 2029 and then every 4 years.

The 2019 election saw the Conservatives take a majority of seats on the Council.

Council composition
Prior to the election the composition of the shadow authority was:

After the election the composition of the council was:

Summary

Election result

|-

Ward results

Beacon

Beaminster

Blackmore Vale

Pauline Batstone was subsequently elected the first chair of the council.

Blandford

Bridport

Chalk Valleys

Charminster St Mary's

Chesil Bank

Chickerell

Colehill and Wimborne Minster East

Corfe Mullen

Cranborne and Alderholt

Cranborne Chase

Crossways

Ireland was later elected leader for the Liberal Democrat group.

Dorchester East

Dorchester Poundbury

Dorchester West

Fry was later elected leader of the all for Dorset independent group.

Eggardon

Ferndown North

Ferndown South

Gillingham

Hill Forts and Upper Tarrants

Littlemoor and Preston

O'Leary was the youngest elected councillor aged 20. Cllr Ferrari became the cabinet member for finance and assets.

Lyme and Charmouth

Lytchett Matravers and Upton

Marshwood Vale

Melcombe Regis

Portland

Kimber was later elected leader of the labour and co-op group.

Puddletown and Lower Winterborne

Radipole

Rodwell and Wyke

Sutton was elected as leader of the green group on the council.

Shaftesbury Town

Sherborne East

Sherborne Rural

Sherborne West

South East Purbeck

St Leonards and St Ives

Stalbridge and Marnhull

Stour and Allen Vale

Sturminster Newton

Swanage

Upwey and Broadwey

Verwood

Flower was later elected as the first leader of the council.

Wareham

West Moors and Three Legged Cross

West Parley

West Purbeck

Wharf was later appointed deputy leader of the council

Westham

Wimborne Minster

Winterborne and Broadmayne

Winterborne North

Yetminster

By-elections

Lyme & Charmouth

References

2019 English local elections
May 2019 events in the United Kingdom
2010s in Dorset
Dorset Council elections